Jakob Mikiver (5 August 1881 Kolga Parish (now Kuusalu Parish, Kreis Harrien – 1 June 1964 Loksa Selsoviet, Harju District) was an Estonian politician. He was a member of Estonian Constituent Assembly, representing the Estonian Social Democratic Workers' Party. He was a member of the assembly since 1 July 1919. He replaced Voldemar Hammer.

References

1881 births
1964 deaths
People from Kuusalu Parish
People from Kreis Harrien
Estonian Social Democratic Workers' Party politicians
Members of the Estonian Constituent Assembly